Richard Stanley Roud (July 6, 1929 in Boston – February 13, 1989) was an American writer on film and co-founder, with Amos Vogel, of the New York Film Festival (NYFF). At the NYFF, Roud was a former program director, and latterly director, from 1963 to 1987.

Biography
Richard Roud graduated from the University of Wisconsin in 1950, and after spending a year in Paris on a Fulbright scholarship, undertook post-graduate study at the University of Birmingham. In the 1950s, he became the London correspondent of the French film magazine Cahiers du cinéma. In 1960 he became the director of the London Film Festival, and in 1963 co-founded the New York Film Festival, where he headed up the selection committee. He worked for both festivals until February 1970, when he ceased to be the director of the London Film Festival to concentrate on the New York festival. From 1963 to 1969, he was also film critic for The Guardian of London, a role from which he was fired after writing a one-word review of The Sound of Music (simply, "No."), and was later a roving arts correspondent for the newspaper. He also wrote annual reports from the Cannes Film Festival, and other articles, for the British film publication Sight and Sound.

Roud's books include Cinema - A Critical Dictionary - The Major Film-Makers (1980), a two-volume work which he edited; A Passion for Film (1983), a biography of Henri Langlois, the former director of the Cinémathèque Française; and two books on nouvelle vague directors Straub and Godard. A volume of Roud's previously uncollected writings, Decades Never Start on Time: A Richard Roud Anthology, was published by the BFI in 2014.

He was made a Knight in the French Legion of Honor in 1979 and was the recipient of the National Society of Film Critics Awards (USA) Special Award in January 1988.

References

External links
Obituary, The New York Times, February 16, 1989.

1929 births
1989 deaths
20th-century American businesspeople
Alumni of the University of Birmingham
Film festival founders